Margit Ladomerszky (17 December 1904 – 10 October 1979) was a Hungarian actress.

Selected filmography
 Spring Shower (1932)
 Romance of Ida (1934)
 Istvan Bors (1939)
 Gül Baba (1940)
 Sarajevo (1940)
 Szeptember végén (1942)
 Changing the Guard (1942)
 Dr. Kovács István (1942)
 I Dreamt You (1943)
 Ez történt Budapesten (1944)
 Kis Katalin házassága (1950)
 A hamis Izabella (1968)

External links

1904 births
1979 deaths
Hungarian film actresses
Actresses from Budapest
20th-century Hungarian actresses